The Acid House is a 1994 book by Irvine Welsh, later made into a film of the same name. It is a collection of 22 short stories, with each story (between three and 20 pages) featuring a new set of characters and scenarios.

Stories
 "The Shooter"
 "Eurotrash"
 "Stoke Newington Blues"
 "Vat '96"
 "A Soft Touch"
 "The Last Resort On The Adriatic"
 "Sexual Disaster Quartet"
 "Snuff"
 "A Blockage In The System"
 "Wayne Foster"
 "Where the Debris Meets the Sea"
 "Granny's Old Junk"
 "The House of John Deaf"
 "Across the Hall"
 "Lisa's Mum Meets the Queen Mum"
 "The Two Philosophers"
 "Disnae Matter"
 "The Granton Star Cause"
 "Snowman Building Parts for Rico the Squirrel"
 "Sport For All"
 "The Acid House"
 "A Smart Cunt (A Novella)"

Film adaptation
The 1998 film, The Acid House, directed by Paul McGuigan, dramatizes 3 of the 22 stories from the book - "The Granton Star Cause", "A Soft Touch", and "The Acid House".

References

1994 short story collections
Short story collections by Irvine Welsh
Short stories about drugs
Short stories adapted into films
Jonathan Cape books
Fiction about God

sk:Acid House